Saliamangalam was one of the 234 constituencies in the Tamil Nadu Legislative Assembly of Tamil Nadu a southern state of India. It was in Thanjavur district.

Members of Legislative Assembly

Election results

1962

References

External links
 

Thanjavur district
Former assembly constituencies of Tamil Nadu